Baldia may refer to:

 The Urdu language word meaning municipal administration:
 Baldia Town in the City of Karachi
 Baldia, Bangladesh
 Baldia (worm), a genus in the family Capitellidae